My Kind Of Evil is the third album (2004) of blues guitarist, singer, and bandleader JW-Jones. It was produced by multi-Grammy nominee Kim Wilson (singer for The Fabulous Thunderbirds) and featured fellow Canadian Colin James on two tracks.

Personnel
JW-Jones - guitar, vocals
Rick Rangno - trumpet
Brian Asselin - tenor saxophone 
Steve Trecarten - tenor saxophone 
Frank Scanga - baritone saxophone 
Kim Wilson - harmonica, vocals
Geoff Daye - organ, piano
Nathan Morris - bass
Bill Brennan - drums
Colin James - vocals
Roxanne Potvin - vocals

References

JW-Jones albums
2004 albums